President Forever 2008 + Primaries  is a political simulation game that incorporates realism mixed with fiction. It simulates  United States presidential elections and primary elections in 1960, 1980, 1992, 2000, 2004, and 2008. President Forever 2008 was developed and released by TheorySpark, a developer specializing in political games, on October 12, 2006. The game is an updated version of the original President Forever.

Players must win enough Electoral College votes to win the election, or for smaller parties or candidates a successful campaign may require as little as achieving 5% nationally. The player is responsible for all aspects of their chosen candidate's campaign, from planning and buying advertising to recruiting high-profile and grassroots supporters.

Gameplay

Once the player has decided on their candidate, it's time to crush the opposition. Starting on October 1, 2007, a successful candidate must develop strategies that will out-wit their opponents and also focus their limited resources by choosing which states they will target and how much expend on each one. Players can recruit new foot soldiers in individual states to help boost the momentum and draw voters based on local efforts. To help spread the campaign message across all states in a candidate's strategy, a player can use big-name crusaders to travel from state to state to help drum up popular support.
 
Like most strategy games, all candidates have a set of attributes that help them when performing activities throughout the game.  Attributes such as leadership, integrity, charisma and experience remain static throughout the game, but other attributes like issue familiarity and debating skill can be developed by practice and research. All attributes work together to help a candidate during debates, speeches and their vulnerability to high-powered scandals.
 

To effectively win supporters, a player must decide on the theme of their campaign as well as their beliefs on the core issues. Changing a candidates position on hot issues will help attract voters to their campaigns, but drastic shifts from the candidates original beliefs will cause the candidate's campaign to be discredited due to "flip-flopping". The media will release high-profile news stories which will damage a candidate's national momentum and voters will become alienated.
 

A candidate's success throughout the elections is closely tied to their momentum in each state, as voters are drawn to high-profile candidates with much momentum propelling their campaigns. Candidates need to focus on gaining momentum by creating advertising campaigns, visiting states and fundraising. Good advertising campaigns will help convince the electorate that they are right for the presidency or a player can create campaigns focused on tarnishing other candidates in the lead. Negative advertising campaigns run the risk of backfiring and therefore painting a player's campaign as overly negative. Visiting the voters in their states, or barnstorming, works well towards drawing voters and also helps to boost the morale of the candidate's foot soldiers in that state. Barnstorm too often though, and your message will fall on deaf ears.
 
A candidate also needs to work on creating a well established campaign by investing time, money and command points into developing the campaign. A well established campaign brings in more fundraising dollars and provides the player with more Command Points to work with.

Playable candidates 
The United States 2008 scenario includes most of the candidates that decided to run as well as those that declined to run. Candidates that are still officially running are turned on by default and are all playable. Withdrawn candidates are turned off by default, but can be turned on by the player to run a purely fictional race.

 Republican candidates

 Rudy Giuliani, former Mayor of New York City.
 Mike Huckabee, former Governor of Arkansas.
 Duncan Hunter, Representative from California.
 John McCain, Senator from Arizona, 2008 republican candidate for president.
 Ron Paul, Representative from Texas and 1988 Libertarian Presidential nominee.
 Mitt Romney, former Governor of Massachusetts, 2012 republican nominee for president.
 Tom Tancredo, Representative from Colorado.
 Fred Thompson, former Senator from Tennessee.
 George Allen (off), former Senator from Virginia.
 Sam Brownback (off), Senator from Kansas, withdrew October 19, 2007, and later endorsed John McCain.
 Bill Frist (off), former Senator from Tennessee.
 Newt Gingrich (off), former Speaker of the House from Georgia.

 Democratic candidates

 Joe Biden, Senator from Delaware, future vice president and president of the United States and winner of the 2020 presidential election
 Hillary Clinton, Senator and former First Lady from New York, 2016 presidential candidate.
 Christopher Dodd, Senator from Connecticut.
 John Edwards, former Senator from North Carolina and 2004 Democratic Vice-Presidential Nominee.
 Dennis Kucinich, Representative from Ohio.
 Barack Obama, Senator from Illinois, was elected president in 2008
 Bill Richardson, Governor of New Mexico, former Representative from New Mexico and former United States Ambassador to the UN.
 Wesley Clark (off), retired General of the United States Army. Declined to run and endorsed Senator Hillary Clinton.
 Evan Bayh (off), Senator from Indiana, former Governor of Indiana. Declined to run and endorsed Senator Hillary Clinton.
 Al Gore (off), former Vice President of the United States and 2000 Democratic Presidential Nominee.
 John Kerry (off), Senator from Massachusetts and 2004 Democratic Presidential Nominee.
 Mark Warner (off), former Governor of Virginia.
 Tom Vilsack (off), former Governor of Iowa, withdrew February 23, 2007, and endorsed Senator Clinton.

 Libertarian candidate

 Bob Barr (off)
 Wayne Allyn Root (off)
 Mary Ruwart (off)
 Constitution Party candidate

 Chuck Baldwin (off)

Candidate Editor 
The game also comes with a candidate editor. The editor allows you to alter the attributes or characteristics of each candidate as well as parties. The editor was released as part of an update to the game. Many scenarios are created and published to http://campaigns.270soft.com/ where players are able to download and play the scenario. The candidate editor allows flexibility in editing, although for building scenarios, many users download Campaigns Forever, which is an alternate software made by the same publisher.

Development
The game engine was developed with enough complexity to accurately model voter affiliation, but the flexibility of the game design allows for players to create their own fictional scenarios as well as the ability for players to share their modded scenarios with each other. As well as a number of user created scenarios based on the games default map, the modding community has and continues to produce a number of unique and original scenarios using TheorySpark's Campaigns Forever tool.

Reception
Reviewers have found the game to be technical and geared towards 'hardcore' political gamers. Generation Gamerz's Fareed Guyot described it as "a political wonk's dream." He found the game addictive, stating "Like SimCity and the Tycoon series, this game is like watching the monkeys at the zoo, it's hard to turn away".

The Philadelphia Inquirer's Dennis McCauley found the game fun for himself and a good opportunity for educators, saying that in the final analysis "President Forever will keep political wonks glued to their PC screens" and that it's "a terrific option for teaching the political process in the classroom."

The Seattle-Post Intelligencer similarly said that "this ultra in-depth election simulation game is just the thing for the armchair politico who's always dreamed of running a campaign of his or her own."

Independent gaming website Game Tunnel's writers found the game detailed but difficult to comprehend, awarding a combined score of 6.5 out of 10. Mike Hommel said "I think this game is probably the ultimate for the very hardcore niche it serves". He found the game confusing and the manual unfit to explain the complexities of the game, he suggested the game needs a tutorial. John Bardinelli found the game "... a bit overwhelming for a non-politico.", adding "President Forever is a feast for the politically minded gamer, but everyone else will be left scratching their heads." William Usher was more positive, stating "It's amazing how much depth and detail went into this very aesthetically bare-boned game."

Sequel
President Forever 2016 has been released.
http://270soft.com/us-election-games/president-election-game-2016/
In 2020 the game was rebranded to President infinity.

References

External links
 TheorySpark* homepage 
 President Forever 2008 + Primaries Info Page
 User Created Scenarios

2006 video games
Cultural depictions of Al Gore
Cultural depictions of Hillary Clinton
Cultural depictions of Joe Biden
Cultural depictions of politicians
Government simulation video games
Indie video games
North America-exclusive video games
2008 United States presidential election in popular culture
Video games developed in Canada
Video games set in 2007
Video games set in 2008
Video games set in the United States
Windows games
Windows-only games